Norman Raeben (1901 – 12 December 1978) was an American painter.

Life
He was born in the Russian Empire, the youngest of the six children, four girls and two boys, of Yiddish author Sholom Aleichem. Aleichem's most famous character, Tevye the Milkman, gave the blueprint for the musical Fiddler on the Roof.

Raeben's father's name, Sholom Aleichem, is a pen-name that means "peace unto to you". His father's name at birth was Solomon Rabinowitz. Raeben modeled his own pseudonymous last name on "Rabinowitz". In his native Russia Rueben was known as "Numa".

Raeben moved to New York City with his family in 1914. He studied painting from Robert Henri, George Luks and John French Sloan, who all belonged to the Ashcan School. His studio was on the 11th floor of Carnegie Hall.

His student, Carolyn Schlam, a painter and author, studied with Raeben five days a week for seven years in the 1970s. In her book The Creative Path: A View from the Studio on the Making of Art, she describes in detail his studio, his teachings, and the experience of being one of his students. She describes "riding up the in the elevator and hearing the voices of the opera singers, echoes of violins and pianos, and the myriad sounds" of artists working in the building’s many studios. Raeben was a "robust lion of a man" with a "commanding personality". Raeben's studio was not large, and had windows on all sides. The weekly schedule began on Monday, when he taught still life, then on Tuesday and Thursday a live model was provided. Raeben was a very involved teacher, and would demonstrate or lecture passionately.  He would move about the room, often stopping at a student’s canvas, and calling the other students over for an impromptu lesson. He taught his students not only how to draw and paint, but also the meanings and philosophies underlying what they were doing, what it meant to be an artist, and Raeben's Ten Commandments.

His other students included Bob Dylan, Bernice Sokol Kramer, Andrew Gottlieb, Janet Cohn, John Smith-Amato, Diana Postel, Lori Lerner, Rosalyn (Roz) Jacobs and the photographer, Larry Herman. Raeben's mission was to teach the art of painting through intuition and feeling, instead of through conceptualization. During the seventies, his inspiring lessons ran counter to the then prevalent conceptualism of contemporary mainstream art.

Early in 1974, Bob Dylan studied painting with Raeben five days a week from 8:30 am to 4:00 in the afternoon, for two months. This was when he was composing his album Blood on the Tracks. Dylans said that Raeben "put my mind and my hand and my eye together, in a way that allowed me to do consciously what I unconsciously felt."  Dylan said the Raeben "didn’t teach you so much how to draw … he looked into you and told you what you were." Raeben taught Dylan how to create narratives the placed "yesterday, today and tomorrow all in the same room." Dylan's song "Tangled Up in Blue" took its title from a comment that Rueben made regarding one of Dylan's paintings.

Bob Dylan was mystified, at first, by Norman's didactic insistence on perceptual honesty, i.e. on not exaggerating the truth of what was seen, when first learning the basics of drawing. "Bob", Norman said, "look at that round coffee table. Now, show me how you would paint it."

Raeben was a chess prodigy. His father once claimed that if he earned millions from Hollywood, he would buy his son a gold chess set.

He died of a heart attack in the lobby of his apartment. He was survived by his wife, Victoria, his son, Jay Raeben, president of the Physicians Radio Network, and his sister–the author, Marie Waife‐Goldberg.

Available Academic Studies 
A first contribution on Raeben's influence on Bob Dylan was published by scholar Alessandro Carrera in his book La voce di Bob Dylan. Un racconto dell'America in 2011.More recently, his works and teachings have been collected and studied by scholar Fabio Fantuzzi in the book "All the Way from New Orleans to New Jerusalem": Norman Raeben e Bob Dylan (2020), which offers a comprehensive analysis of his life, art career, and influence on Dylan. Other contributions on his art and influence can also be found in the book Bob Dylan and the Arts. Songs, Film, Painting, and Sculpture in Dylan’s Universe (ESL, 2020), which collects essays and first-hand stories by academics, artists, songwriters, and music critics.

References

Bibliography
 Carrera, Alessandro. La voce di Bob Dylan. Un racconto dell'America. Milano: Feltrinelli, 2011.
 Fantuzzi, Fabio. "I dieci comandamenti dell'arte: Bob Dylan e l'eterno dilemma tra genio e plagio", Musica/Realtà, 105, 2014.
 Fantuzzi, Fabio. "Cenni di ermeneutica ebraica nelle teorie di Norman Raeben, figlio di Scholem Aleichem e maestro di Bob Dylan", in Tales of Unfulfilled Times. Saggi critici in onore di Dario Calimani, ed. by Fabio Fantuzzi. Venezia: Edizioni Ca' Foscari, 2017: 53–77.
 Fantuzzi, Fabio. "All the Way from New Orleans to New Jerusalem": Norman Raeben e Bob Dylan. Ph.D. thesis, Roma: Università degli Studi Roma Tre, 2020.
 Carrera, Alessandro, Maria Anita Stefanelli and Fabio Fantuzzi (ed. by). Bob Dylan and the Arts. Songs, Film, Painting, and Sculpture in Dylan’s Universe. Roma: Edizioni di Storia e Letteratura, 2020.

External links
 
 Fantuzzi, Fabio. "Cenni di ermeneutica ebraica nelle teorie di Norman Raeben, figlio di Scholem Aleichem e maestro di Bob Dylan", in Tales of Unfulfilled Times. Saggi critici in onore di Dario Calimani, ed. by Fabio Fantuzzi. Venezia: Edizioni Ca' Foscari, 2017: https://edizionicafoscari.unive.it/en/edizioni4/libri/978-88-6969-157-7/cenni-di-ermeneutica-ebraica-nelle-teorie-di-norma/
 Fantuzzi, Fabio. "All the Way from New Orleans to New Jerusalem: Norman Raeben e Bob Dylan", Università degli Studi Roma Tre, 2020: https://arcadia.sba.uniroma3.it/handle/2307/40804?locale=so
 Carrera, Alessandro, Maria Anita Stefanelli and Fabio Fantuzzi (ed. by). Bob Dylan and the Arts. Songs, Film, Painting, and Sculpture in Dylan’s Universe. Roma, Edizioni di Storia e Letteratura, 2020: https://www.academia.edu/45079386/Bob_Dylan_and_the_Arts_Songs_Film_Painting_and_Sculpture_in_Dylans_Universe

 

1901 births
1978 deaths
Students of Robert Henri
20th-century American painters
American male painters
American people of Russian-Jewish descent
Russian Jews
20th-century American male artists
Emigrants from the Russian Empire to the United States